Michel Riesen (born April 11, 1979) is a Swiss former professional ice hockey winger. Most of his career, which lasted from 1994 to 2014, was spent in the Swiss Nationalliga A, though he also played 12 games in the National Hockey League with the Edmonton Oilers during the 2000–01 season. Internationally Riesen played for the Swiss national team in several junior tournaments and three World Championships. After retiring he turned to coaching, and has worked at the junior levels in Switzerland since 2015.

Playing career
He was selected in the first round of the 1997 NHL Entry Draft, 14th overall, by the Edmonton Oilers. At the time he was the highest drafted Swiss player in NHL history.

Riesen was twice a member of Switzerland's World Junior team (1997, 1998) and a member of its World Championship team (1998). Riesen made his North American debut on the AHL's Hamilton Bulldogs team in 1998–99. Riesen played three seasons in Hamilton with his best season being in 1999–00 when he registered 60 points (29G-31A).

Riesen made his NHL debut in the 2000–01 season with the Oilers, playing in 12 games in what would be his only NHL season. On July 1, 2001, Riesen was traded from the Oilers, along with Doug Weight, to the St. Louis Blues for Marty Reasoner, Jochen Hecht and Jan Horacek. Riesen never played for the Blues, opting to head back to Switzerland for the 2001–02 season to rejoin HC Davos.

In the 2006-07 season, Riesen was the top goal scorer in the NLA with 37 goals.

Career statistics

Regular season and playoffs

International

References

External links
 

1979 births
Living people
Edmonton Oilers draft picks
Edmonton Oilers players
EHC Biel players
Hamilton Bulldogs (AHL) players
HC Davos players
National Hockey League first-round draft picks
SC Rapperswil-Jona Lakers players
Sportspeople from the canton of Bern
Swiss ice hockey right wingers
Swiss expatriate sportspeople in Canada
Swiss expatriate ice hockey people
Expatriate ice hockey players in Canada